L'Impériale can refer to:

 Imperial Oil, Canadian oil company
 Symphony No. 53 (Haydn), nicknamed "L'Impériale"